Roadbike Philippines, also known as 7 Eleven–Cliqq–air21 by Roadbike Philippines for sponsorship reasons with 7-Eleven and Airfreight 2100, Inc., is a Philippine UCI Continental cycling team managed by Ric Rodriguez and sponsored by 7-Eleven.

In 2019, a women's and under-23 team was formed by Roadbike Philippines to complement the men's elite team.

In 2016, the  team represented the country in the Tour de Langkawi, after a long hiatus.

Team roster

Major wins 
2013
Southeast Asian Games Jr ITT, Mark Galedo
2014
Overall, Le Tour de Filipinas, Mark Galedo
Stage 2, Mark Galedo
2016
Stage 1 Jelajah Malaysia, Rustom Lim
2017
Stage 4 Tour de Flores, Edgar Nohales Nieto
2019
Overall, PRUride PH, Marcelo Felipe
Stage 2 Ronda Pilipinas, Marcelo Felipe
Stage 6 Tour de Singkarak, Rustom Lim

References

External links 

UCI Continental Teams (Asia)
Cycling teams based in the Philippines